Dominic Charles Goodman (born 23 October 2000) is an English cricketer. He made his first-class debut on 15 April 2021, for Gloucestershire in the 2021 County Championship. He made his List A debut on 7 August 2022, for Gloucestershire in the 2022 Royal London One-Day Cup.

Goodman was born in Ashford, Kent. He attended Dr Challoner's Grammar School in Amersham. Having moved to Bristol, he studied at Clifton College before moving on to the University of Exeter. As a young cricketer he represented Buckinghamshire at age-group level. He joined the academy at Gloucestershire in 2017, and signed his first professional contract with the club in 2020.

References

External links
 

2000 births
Living people
English cricketers
Buckinghamshire cricketers
Gloucestershire cricketers
People from Ashford, Kent
People educated at Dr Challoner's Grammar School
People educated at Clifton College